Marjo Rein (born 1967) is a Finnish news presenter and television personality. She is best known as the host of the show Yle Uutiset, by the Finnish Broadcasting Company.

References

Living people
1967 births
Date of birth missing (living people)
Place of birth missing (living people)
Finnish television personalities
Finnish television journalists
Women television journalists